Xiaohe District (小河区; pinyin: Xiǎohé Qū) is a former district of Guizhou, China. It is now merged into Huaxi District.

External links
Downloadable article: "Evidence that a West-East admixed population lived in the Tarim Basin as early as the early Bronze Age" Li et al. BMC Biology 2010, 8:15. 

County-level divisions of Guizhou
Guiyang